The Lost Girl is a novel by D. H. Lawrence, first published in 1920. It was awarded the 1920 James Tait Black Memorial Prize in the fiction category.
Lawrence started it shortly after writing Women in Love, and worked on it only sporadically until he completed it in 1920.

Synopsis
Alvina Houghton, the daughter of a widowed Midlands draper, comes of age just as her father’s business is failing. In a desperate attempt to regain his fortune and secure his daughter’s proper upbringing, James Houghton buys a theater. Among the traveling performers he employs is Ciccio, a sensual Italian who immediately captures Alvina’s attention. Fleeing with him to Naples, she leaves her safe world behind and enters one of sexual awakening, desire, and fleeting freedom.

Editions 

 The Lost Girl (1920), edited by John Worthen, pub. Cambridge University Press, 1981, .
 The Lost Girl, pub. New York: Thomas Seltzer, 1921.  Online edition at Google Books. Snippet view, United States Only.

References

External links 

 
 Second edition at the Internet Archive
 

Novels by D. H. Lawrence
1920 British novels
Martin Secker books